Templer is an English surname.

Templer may also refer to:

 Detective Chief Superintendent Gill Templer, a character in the TV series Inspector Rebus
 RMAS Colonel Templer (A229), an acoustic research vessel of the Royal Maritime Auxiliary Service
 Templer Medal, awarded by the Society for Army Historical Research, United Kingdom
 Templer Park, a forest reserve in Rawang, Malaysia
 Gerald Templer, a British army officer

See also
 Templers (Pietist sect)
 Templar (disambiguation)
 Templer, an English surname